Cornthwaite Hector (5 November 1773 – 14 February 1842) was the Radical Member of Parliament for Petersfield on two occasions during the 19th-century.

Born at Portsmouth, England, on 5 November 1773, Hector, a banker and brewer, formerly a steward to the Jolliffe family for 30 years, was first elected Member of Parliament for Petersfield in 1835. At the 1837 election, a petition was lodged against the winner, William Jolliffe, and his election declared void. After scrutiny of the ballots, Hector was declared elected in 1838.

He died at his home Stodham House, Petersfield. His grandson, Cornthwaite John Hector, was one of the founders of Melbourne, Florida, and its first postmaster.

References

1773 births
1842 deaths
UK MPs 1835–1837
UK MPs 1837–1841
Businesspeople from Portsmouth
English bankers
Members of the Parliament of the United Kingdom for English constituencies
Politicians from Portsmouth